David Feuchtwang (27 November 1864 – 6 July 1936) was a Jewish scholar and author, and chief rabbi of Vienna from 1933 until his death in 1936.

David Feuchtwang was born in Nikolsburg, Moravia (now Mikulov, Czech Republic) on 27 November 1864, the son of Mayer Feuchtwang, who was rabbi of Nikolsburg from 1861 to 1888.

References

External links
 Kriegs-Hagadah 1914 Haggadot with commentary provided by David Feuchtwang, at the Leo Baeck Institute, New York

1864 births
1936 deaths
People from Mikulov
20th-century Austrian rabbis
Chief rabbis of Vienna